The Argyle Library Egg (also known as the Argyle Library Egg by Kutchinsky) is a jewelled egg composed of gold and diamonds. Commissioned by Argyle Diamonds of Perth, Australia and completed in 1990 by Paul Kutchinsky, its design was inspired by the ornate Fabergé eggs that noted jeweller Peter Carl Fabergé created for the Russian royal family in the late 19th and early 20th centuries.

Craftsmanship 
Standing more than two feet (60 cm) tall, the egg is fashioned from 33 lbs (15 kg) of 18 carat gold sheets and is studded with 24,000 pink diamonds. Six master craftsmen labored a combined 7000 hours over ten months to complete the creation of the egg. Reportedly, Paul Kutchinsky individually hand selected each diamond used in the design. The completed egg was valued at approximately $11.5 million.

Surprise 
Paying homage to Faberge's tradition of hiding a "surprise" inside each of his eggs, the Argyle Library Egg was designed to open and reveal a rotating miniature library and portrait gallery. The egg had a complex electronic mechanism to pull back the shell and rotate the interior for display, although this mechanism reportedly experienced a few technical problems after the completed egg began a world tour in 1990. The portrait gallery, containing five enameled frames, was based upon a design that Fabergé produced for the Russian tsars.

Exhibition and ownership 
The finished egg was unveiled in April 1990 by Kutchinsky, who then exhibited the work around the world (including at a 1990 showcase of British craftsmanship at the Victorian and Albert Museum and the Melbourne Cup the same year) while looking for a buyer. The 1991 edition of the Guinness Book of World Records named the work as "the largest and most elaborate 'Easter Egg.'" In 1992, the egg was on display as the centerpiece of the Australian Pavilion at the 1992 Universal Exposition in Seville, Spain. 

After failing to find a buyer for the egg and with the onset of the first Gulf War, Kutchinsky faced financial difficulties. Possession of the egg reverted to Argyle Mining, who used the egg as a showpiece to promote its diamonds. Eventually, the company sold the egg to a private collector, after which its whereabouts were unknown for many years. However, in 2013, Kutchinksy's daughter, journalist Serena Kutchinsky, reported that the egg is owned by a Japanese businessman in Tokyo, who displays the egg in his chateau's foyer.

See also 
Fabergé egg
Peter Carl Fabergé
Egg decorating

References

External links 
 
 
 

Decorative arts
Individual items of jewellery